Katherine Sui Fun Cheung (1904–2003) was a Chinese aviator. She received one of the first private licenses issued to a Chinese woman and was the first Chinese woman to obtain an international flying license. She became a United States citizen after attaining her licensing.

Early life 
Zhang Ruifen was born on 12 December 1904 in Enping, Guangdong province, China to Nie Qinglan and Zhang Shunbing. Her mother had been a student at the Paxian Bible School in Guangzhou (formerly known as Canton) and her father was a businessman who interacted with the overseas Chinese community in the United States. Her mother took Zhang to Guangzhou while she was a child and she completed her primary education at the Guangzhou True Light Middle School. Continuing her schooling at the Guangzhou City Peidao Women's High School (zh-yue), graduating in 1921 when she passed the Ministry of Education's examination.

Upon her graduation, she obtained a passport and at the age of seventeen moved to the United States to study music at several institutions including the Los Angeles Conservatory of Music, California State Polytechnic University, Pomona, and the University of Southern California (USC). Her father, who was a produce buyer, came with Zhang to the U.S. and would take her to Dycer Airport in Los Angeles to practice driving a car. Zhang was fascinated with the planes and wanted to learn to fly. After three years of studying piano at USC, Zhang quit school and married her father's business partner, George Young, keeping her own name, but Americanizing it to Katherine Cheung. By 1931, she had two daughters, Doris and Dorothy and was determined to take up flying. In a letter from a friend back in China, she was informed that Chinese flying schools would not allow women to enroll as pilots, which was not unusual, as in the U.S. at that time only 1% of licensed pilots were women.

Aviation training 
In 1931, Cheung enrolled in aviation classes, taking flying lessons with the Chinese Aeronautical Association in Los Angeles with flight instructor Bert Ekstein. On 30 March 1932 she received her private pilot's license and made plans to return within a few weeks to China. She was widely reported as the first Chinese woman to earn a license in the United States, or having earned a commercial license, while other papers acknowledged that she was one of two Chinese women pilots. After attaining her license, she continued to study, often with military pilots to learn aerobatics, aircraft structures, international routing, navigation and other skills which would improve her versatility as a pilot. The skills she learned, allowed her to participate in air shows, performing barrel rolls, inverted flying, loops and other aerobatic tricks.

Almost as soon as she was licensed, Cheung began performing at fairs and air shows along the California Coast. Her performances were thrilling to the Chinese American community and they took up a collection to get her a plane to use. Anna May Wong and other ethnic Chinese spent $2,000 to secure a 125-horsepower Fleet biplane for Cheung. She participated in several racing events, like the Los Angeles Women's Championship (1935) and Chatterton Air Race (1936). In 1935 Cheung joined the Ninety Nines club for women pilots, an association founded by Amelia Earhart. That same year, she obtained her international flight license, allowing her to participate in commercial flying, and was claimed to be the first commercial Chinese woman pilot. In 1936, Cheung became a United States citizen, but still harbored dreams of returning to China to work for the Chinese government and teach aviation. She believed that the possibilities for developing air services were boundless and recognized the potential of air service to areas which did not have adequate infrastructure to meet transportation needs.

Following the Japanese invasion of China in 1937, Cheung decided to return to China and open a flying school. She toured Chinese American communities and raised money for the venture, securing $7,000. She purchased a Ryan ST-A, but her cousin was killed while testing the plane. Cheung's father, worrying for Katherine's safety, made her promise to give up flying. While she continued for a few years, the loss of her friend Earhart, her cousin, and her father, coupled with her brother's death in China in 1942, finally convinced her to give up flying, as she was then sole support for her mother.

During World War II, she became a flight instructor in the United States and when the war ended, she bought a flower shop, which she operated until her retirement in 1970. In 1989, Cheung, one of her daughters and a son-in-law, returned to China to visit Enping. Their vacation brought much media attention, as she was feted by various associations, the local government, and the aviation industry. Until the 1990s, she lived in Chinatown, but at that time, she relocated to Thousand Oaks, California, where she would remain until her death. On 4 March 2001, Lan Hua Jun, the Chinese Consul General of Los Angeles, presented Cheung with a medal on behalf of the Chinese government for her contributions as an aviation pioneer. The ceremony was held in conjunction with her induction into the International Women in Aviation's Pioneer Hall of Fame.

Death and legacy
Cheung died at age 98 on 2 September 2003 and was buried at Forest Lawn Memorial Park in Hollywood Hills. She has been recognized by a display at the Aviation Museum in Enping and the Beijing Air Force Aviation Museum in China. Cheung has been recognized by the Smithsonian's National Air and Space Museum as the "First Asian American Aviatrix" and Flight Path Walk of Fame in Los Angeles has honored her with a bronze plaque bearing her name. In addition to other awards and recognition, she was the subject of a 2016 documentary entitled Aviatrix: The Katherine Sui Fun Cheung Story. Two statues were built in 2017 to honor Katherine in her hometown of Enping, China. She was also featured in a six-minute documentary segment for CCTV in 2019

See also
 Ninety-Nines (International Organization of Women Pilots)

References

Bibliography

External links
CCTV documentary series includes segment about Katherine Sui Fun Cheung
Aviatrix: The Katherine Sui Fun Cheung Story Documentary
Aviatrix: The Katherine Sui Fun Cheung Story Website
Hark! A Vagrant: Katherine Sui Fun Cheung
The Argonaut News
 Pioneers - Katherine Sui Fun Cheung 

1904 births
2003 deaths
Los Angeles Conservatory of Music alumni
California Polytechnic State University alumni
Pomona College alumni
USC Thornton School of Music alumni
People from Guangzhou
Republic of China (1912–1949) emigrants to the United States
Chinese women aviators
American women aviators
American aviators of Chinese descent
20th-century American women
20th-century American people
21st-century American women